Brooke Holmes is an American classicist. She is the Susan Dod Brown Professor of Classics at Princeton University. She is the author of two books, and a co-editor of a third book about Heinrich von Staden. She was awarded a Guggenheim Fellowship in 2018.

Holmes graduated magna cum laude from Columbia University in 1998, received a D.E.A. from Sorbonne University in 2002, and a PhD from Princeton University in 2005.

Selected works

References

Living people
Columbia University alumni
Paris-Sorbonne University alumni
Princeton University alumni
Princeton University faculty
American classical scholars
American women academics
Year of birth missing (living people)
21st-century American women